Pryluky is a city and municipality located on the Udai River in Chernihiv Oblast, north-central Ukraine. It serves as the administrative center of Pryluky Raion (district). Located nearby is the Pryluky air base, a major strategic bomber base during the Cold War, which is Ukraine's largest airfield. Population:

History

Archeological excavations have shown that a settlement on the territory of the present-day city dates back to the second millennium BC. According to one explanation, the city derived its name from its location, being situated on a turn in the river that looked like a bow when viewed from above. Another theory holds that the city's name connotes the idea of being situated “on floodplain meadows”.

Pryluky was first mentioned in 1085 by Prince Volodymyr Monomakh in his Precepts To My Children. That year the city-fortress sheltered the prince and his entourage from the horde of Polovtsy and soon the prince's armed forces, strengthened by the Pryluky militia, routed the enemy. However, in 1092 the Polovtsy attacked the fortress once more wiping out the whole population and sacking the city.

Later, the city was repeatedly plundered by eastern nomadic tribes and became a centre of internecine wars between Ruthenian princes. In 1239, Pryluky was destroyed by the Mongols; in 1362, the city was conquered by Lithuanian feudal lords. But the citizens always staunchly defended Pryluky, fighting for their freedom and dignity.

After the Union of Lublin of 1569, according to which the city came under the rule of the Polish nobility, many inhabitants of Pryluky and nearby villages began to run away, seeking freedom in the vast Dnieper steppes. Oppressed peasants from other areas of central and eastern Ukraine took refuge there too. Settlements founded by the runaways in the late 15th-early 16th centuries occupied large territories in the vicinity of Kyiv and Cherkasy. Thus grew the Cossack community. Scared by the proliferation and popularity of Cossacks, Poland tried to suppress this spontaneous resistance but did so in vain.

In the 17th century the Cossacks took part in the Khmelnytsky uprising. The fertile soil of the Udai basin proved itself attractive not only to marauders, but also to hard-working people fleeing from backbreaking toil. The number of inhabitants of Pryluky and adjacent villages grew considerably in the 17th century. One of the documents kept in the archives of Stockholm, Sweden stated that there were 800 chimneys, i.e. 800 houses, in Pryluky in 1632. Assuming that each house accommodated at least six persons, about 5,000 people lived in the city at that time.

In 1648, Hetman Bohdan Khmelnytsky introduced a new system of territorial-administrative division in Ukraine, having divided the country into regiments. Under this system the city of Pryluky became the military center of the Pryluky Regiment and Colonel Ivan Shkurat-Melnychenko was appointed its first commander. The regiment comprised about 2,000 Cossacks, who actively participated in many battles during the war of 1648–1654. For instance, the entire Pryluky Regiment of Cossacks, led by I. Shkurat, died fighting valiantly in the Battle of Berestechko in 1651. The Pryluky Regiment, under Colonel Yakiv Voronchenko, demonstrated thorough military prowess in defeating a large Polish unit in June 1652. The regiment also took part in campaigns against Poland and Turkey.

Girded with a high rampart surmounted by guns, the city of Pryluky looked quite formidably at the time. However, in the second half of the 18th century, the border was moved far to the south for political and military reasons and the necessity for fortified cities like Pryluky disappeared. Olexandr Yakubovych was the last colonel of Pryluky. In 1781, the Cossack regime was abolished in Ukraine and Pryluky became an uyezd of the Malorossiya Governorate, and from 1802 the Poltava Governorate. Since 1932 it has been a city within the Chernihiv Oblast. During World War II, Pryluky was occupied by the German Army from 18 September 1941 to 18 September 1943. During the occupation, Jews were recruited for forced labor. On 18 October 1941 a murder operation that had several Jewish victims was carried out. A ghetto was established at the beginning of 1942. From January 1942 groups of 30-40 young healthy men were systematically taken from the ghetto and executed at an unknown location. Most of the Jews of Pryluky were killed in a mass murder operation in May 1942. Another mass murder was carried out by Germans in Pryluky on 10 September 1942. Jews from Polova, Ladan, and Linovitsa of Pryluky County and from Kharitonovka, Podol, Radkovka and Malaya Devitsa of other counties of the Chernigov District were murdered in Pryluky.

Pryluky is on the list of Ukraine's oldest cities, and in 1995 it was entered in the register of Ukrainian historical cities. Under the auspices of the “Innovations in Cultural Development of the Regions” program, the Pryluky local government is taking measures to restore old folk art traditions as well as seeking historical and architectural records of the city. City inhabitants hope that with time, Pryluky will become a part of the Golden Ring of the Chernihiv Region tour.

Until 18 July 2020, Pryluky was designated as a city of oblast significance and did not belong to Pryluky Raion even though it was the center of the raion. As part of the administrative reform of Ukraine, which reduced the number of raions of Chernihiv Oblast to four, the city was merged into Pryluky Raion.

Geography and Climate

Demographics

Economy

Culture

Historical Sites
There are many historical sites within Pryluky and many of them are churches, here is a list of those churches:
Ivanivska Church, Pryluky

Government

Education

Infrastructure

Notable natives

Ioasaph of Belgorod, 18th century bishop, glorified in 1911
Yevhen Borovyk (b.1985), footballer
Irving Chernev  (1900–1981), chess player and author
, juggler
 (1895-1976), French painter
Olha Zavhorodnya (b.1983), Ukrainian athlete

Sights
The oldest civil building in the town is the former chancellory and sacristy of the Pryluky Cossack Regiment. Apart from the diminutive Baroque church of St. Nicholas (1720), the town possesses two cathedrals. The old five-domed cathedral was built by Cossacks in the 1710s and 1720s in a simplified brand of Mazepa Baroque. The new Neoclassical cathedral (1806) has one cupola and is dedicated to the Nativity of the Theotokos.

International relations

Twin towns — sister cities
Pryluky is twinned with:
 Kościerzyna in Poland

References

External links

Pryluky in the Encyclopedia of Ukraine
Pryluky portal + photogallery
History of jewish community in Priluki
The murder of the Jews of Pryluky during World War II, at Yad Vashem website.

Cities in Chernihiv Oblast
Priluksky Uyezd
Cossack Hetmanate
Shtetls
Cities of regional significance in Ukraine
Holocaust locations in Ukraine